Valdemaras Chomičius (also known as Valdemaras Homicius; born 4 May 1959) is a Lithuanian former professional basketball player for the Soviet and Lithuanian national basketball team, and an assistant coach for the Lithuanian national team.

His former teams include Žalgiris Kaunas, Forum Valladolid, CAI Zaragoza. He also has played in Italy for Aprimatic Bologna (Serie A2) in the 1990–1991 season. He last played for Olimpas Žemaitija during the 1996–1997 season. He served as player-coach for Kraitenė Marijampolė, was the assistant coach with PBC Ural Great Perm from 1999 to 2004, also serving as head coach for the team in the 2004-2005 season. He briefly coached PBC Dynamo Moscow in 2003, and was the assistant coach for BC UNICS, serving as the team's head coach in the 2009-2010 season. He was also the head coach for Triumph Lyubertsy from 2010 to 2012, BC Dnipro from 2012 to 2015, and worked as a coach for BC Parma in the 2016–17 season. In 2018–2020 he was head coach for BC Dzūkija.

He head coached the Lithuania national team to win the FIBA Stanković Continental Champions' Cup in 2005 FIBA Stanković Continental Champions' Cup.

Honors and awards
 Honored Master of Sports of the USSR: 1982
 Officer's Cross of the Order of the Grand Duke Gediminas: 1995
 Great Commander's Cross of the Order of Merit for Lithuania: 2003

References

External links

FIBA Profile
Sports-Reference.com Profile
Basketball-Reference.com Profile
Spanish League Profile 
Spanish League Archive Profile 
Italian League Profile 

1959 births
Living people
1982 FIBA World Championship players
1986 FIBA World Championship players
Basketball players at the 1988 Summer Olympics
Basketball players at the 1992 Summer Olympics
BC Castors Braine players
BC Dynamo Moscow coaches
BC Sūduva-Mantinga players
BC UNICS coaches
BC Žalgiris players
BC Zenit Saint Petersburg coaches
CB Marbella players
CB Valladolid players
CB Zaragoza players
Lithuanian expatriate basketball people in Russia
FIBA EuroBasket-winning players
FIBA World Championship-winning players
Fortitudo Pallacanestro Bologna players
Honoured Masters of Sport of the USSR
KK Olimpas players
Liga ACB players
Lithuanian basketball coaches
Lithuanian expatriate basketball people in Italy
Lithuanian expatriate basketball people in Spain
Lithuanian expatriate basketball people in Belgium
Lithuanian men's basketball players
Medalists at the 1988 Summer Olympics
Medalists at the 1992 Summer Olympics
Olympic basketball players of Lithuania
Olympic basketball players of the Soviet Union
Olympic bronze medalists for Lithuania
Olympic gold medalists for the Soviet Union
Olympic medalists in basketball
PBC Ural Great coaches
PBC Ural Great players
Point guards
Shooting guards
Soviet men's basketball players
Soviet expatriate sportspeople in Italy
Soviet expatriate basketball people in Spain
Spirou Charleroi players
Basketball players from Kaunas
Lithuanian Sports University alumni